Guy Mortimer Coleridge Davidge, DSO* (2 March 1878 – 17 February 1956) was a British Army officer and first-class cricketer. He was born in Woolwich, the son of Francis Elizabeth and Deputy Surgeon-General John George Davidge of the Army Medical Department. He spent the first two years of his life living in Woolwich, then from 1880 he lived on the Island of Malta where his father was serving as a Brigade Surgeon with the Malta Garrison. His younger sister, Ethel Frances Davidge, died of diphtheria on 8 October 1884 while the family were in Malta. They returned to the UK to live in Portsmouth in October 1885 when Guy was aged seven.

Military career
Following his education at Malvern College, Guy was commissioned a second lieutenant in the Worcestershire Regiment on 16 February 1898, and promoted to lieutenant on 10 January 1900. In October 1901 he was seconded for service in South Africa, during the Second Boer War. He later served in the First World War as an acting lieutenant-colonel commanding the 1st, 2nd and 3rd battalions of the regiment, receiving the Distinguished Service Order (DSO) and bar in 1918 for conspicuous gallantry and leadership in the field. Colonel Davidge later commanded the 2nd Battalion from 1921 to 1925, when he retired.

Lieut.-Colonel G. M. C. Davidge, D.S.O.* died at home in Hove on 17 February 1956, aged 77. Brigadier H. U. Richards, C.B.E., D.S.O., represented the Worcestershire Regiment at the funeral which took place at Brighton on 22 February 1956.

Cricket
Davidge played just once at first-class level, appearing for Worcestershire against Oxford University at The University Parks in May 1911. He was bowled for a duck by Claude Burton in his only innings, and did not bowl, his only contribution to the scorecard coming when he held a catch to dismiss Robert Braddell.

References

External links
Statistical summary from CricketArchive

1878 births
1956 deaths
Military personnel from Kent
English cricketers
Worcestershire cricketers
British Army personnel of the Second Boer War
British Army personnel of World War I
Worcestershire Regiment officers
Companions of the Distinguished Service Order